Noemí Rubio Gil (born 7 December 1983) is a Spanish former footballer, who played as a midfielder.

Career

Rubio started her senior career at Sabadell. With this team she won her first national cup in 2003. In the summer of 2005 she moved from Sabadell, which would disappear just months later, to Espanyol. In her first season in the white and blues she won both the League and Cup. Her time at the club ended abruptly in May 2009 as she uploaded to her Facebook account photos which showed her supporting Espanyol's rival FC Barcelona at the 2008-09 Copa del Rey final in Valencia. Rubio was dismissed from the team for the remainder of the season and her contract was not renewed.

She subsequently moved to Barcelona, where she spent her two last seasons. In June 2011 she won her fourth national cup in a final match against her former team. It was her last game as she retired at just 27 years old. She scored her last goal in the semi-finals against Real Sociedad.

References

1983 births
Living people
Spanish women's footballers
Primera División (women) players
FC Barcelona Femení players
RCD Espanyol Femenino players
CE Sabadell Femení players
Women's association football midfielders
Sportspeople from Sabadell
Footballers from Catalonia
Sportswomen from Catalonia
21st-century Spanish women